2-iminoacetate synthase (thiH (gene)) is an enzyme with systematic name L-tyrosine 4-methylphenol-lyase (2-iminoacetate-forming). This enzyme catalyses the following chemical reaction

 L-tyrosine + S-adenosyl-L-methionine + reduced acceptor  2-iminoacetate + 4-methylphenol + 5'-deoxyadenosine + L-methionine + acceptor + 2 H+

This enzyme binds a 4Fe-4S cluster.

References

External links 
 

EC 4.1.99